The long-tailed fruit bat, long-tailed blossom bat, or Fijian blossom bat (Notopteris macdonaldi) is a species of megabat in the family Pteropodidae. It is found in Fiji and Vanuatu. They roost as large colonies in caves and forage in a range of lowland and montane habitats. They are threatened by exploitation and disturbance of roosting caves, hunting, and tourism.

References

Notopteris
Bats of Oceania
Mammals of Fiji
Mammals of Vanuatu
Vulnerable fauna of Oceania
Mammals described in 1859
Taxonomy articles created by Polbot
Taxa named by John Edward Gray